The Lieber Code (General Orders No. 100, April 24, 1863) was the military law that governed the wartime conduct of the Union Army by defining and describing command responsibility for war crimes and crimes against humanity; and the military responsibilities of the Union soldier fighting the American Civil War (1861–1865) against the Confederate States of America.

The General Orders No. 100: Instructions for the Government of the Armies of the United States in the Field (Lieber Code) were written by Franz Lieber, a German lawyer, political philosopher, and combat veteran of the Napoleonic Wars.

History

Background
At military age, the jurist Franz Lieber soldiered and fought in two wars, first for Prussia in the Napoleonic Wars (1803–1815) and then for the Greek War of Independence (1821) from the Ottoman Empire (1299–1922). In his later career, Lieber was an academic at the College of South Carolina, in the Confederate States of America. Although not personally an abolitionist, Lieber opposed slavery in principle and in practice for having witnessed the brutalities of black chattel slavery in the Confederacy, from which he departed for New York City in 1857. In 1860, Prof. Lieber taught history and political science at the Columbia Law School, and publicly lectured about the “Laws and Usages of War” proposing that the laws of war correspond to a legitimate purpose for the war.

In that time, Lieber had three sons who soldiered in the American Civil War (1861–1865); two sons in the Union Army, and one son in the Confederate Army, who was killed in the Battle of Eltham's Landing (May 7, 1862). Later in 1862, in St. Louis, Missouri, whilst searching for the Union-soldier son wounded at the Battle of Fort Donelson (February 11–16, 1862), Lieber asked the help of his professional acquaintance Major General Henry W. Halleck, who had been a lawyer before the civil war, and was author of International Law, or, Rules Regulating the Intercourse of States in Peace and War (1861) a book of political philosophy that emphasized legal correspondence between the casus belli and the purpose of the war.

Legal dilemma
In fighting the Army, the guerrillas, and the enemy-civilian collaborators of the Confederacy, Union Army soldiers and officers faced ethical dilemmas of command responsibility concerning their summary execution in situ, per military custom, because the 1806 Articles of War did not address the management and disposition of prisoners of war and irregular fighters; nor the management and safe disposition of escaped black slaves — who were not to be repatriated to the Confederacy, per the Act Prohibiting the Return of Slaves (March 13, 1862).

To resolve the lack of military authority in the 1806 Articles of War, Commanding General of the Union Army Halleck commissioned Prof. Lieber to write military laws specific to the modern warfare of the American Civil War. For the Union Army's management and disposal of irregular fighters (guerrillas, spies, saboteurs, et al.), Lieber wrote the tract of military law Guerilla Parties Considered with Reference to the Laws and Usages of War (1862), which disallowed a soldier’s POW-status to Confederate guerrillas and irregular fighters with three functional disqualifications: (i) guerrillas do not wear the army uniform of a belligerent party to the war; (ii) guerrillas have no formal chain of command, like a regular army unit; and (iii) guerrillas cannot take prisoners, as could an army unit.

At the end of 1862, Gen. Halleck and War Secretary Stanton commissioned Lieber to revise the military law of the 1806 Articles of War to include the practical considerations of military necessity and the humanitarian needs of civilian populations under military occupation. The editorial-revision committee, Maj. Gen. Ethan A. Hitchcock and Maj. Gen. George Cadwalader, Maj. Gen. George L. Hartsuff and Brig. Gen. John Henry Martindale, requested from Lieber comprehensive military laws to govern the Union Army’s prosecution of the civil war. Gen. Halleck edited Lieber’s military law to concur with the Emancipation Proclamation (January 1, 1863), and, on April 24, 1863, President Lincoln promulgated General Orders No. 100, Instructions for the Government of the Armies of the United States in the Field, the Lieber Code (1863).

Legal provisions
For the Union Army’s prosecution of the American Civil War, General Orders No. 100 (April 24, 1863) concern the practical particulars of martial law, military jurisdiction, and the treatment of Confederate irregular fighters, such as spies, deserters, and prisoners of war. In the field practice of military justice, the unit commander held authority for any prosecution under the Lieber Code, which command authority included the summary execution of Confederate prisoners of war and war-criminal soldiers of the Union Army. In the context of the American Civil War, the Lieber Code explains the concepts of military necessity and humanitarian needs in articles 14, 15, and 16 of Section I:

In the late 19th century, the Lieber Code was the first modern codification of both customary international law and the law of war of Europe, and later was a basis for the Hague Convention of 1907, which restated and codified the practical particulars of that U.S. military law for application to international war among the signatory countries.

Ethical warfare
As the modernization of the 1806 Articles of War (An Act for Establishing Rules and Articles for the Government of the Armies of the United States), the Lieber Code defines and describes what is a state of civil war, what is military occupation, and explains the politico-military purposes of war; explains what are the permissible and the impermissible military means an army can employ to fight and win a war; and defines and describes the nature of the nation-state, the nature of national sovereignty, and what is rebellion.

The Code requires the humane, ethical treatment of civil populations under the military occupation of the Union Army, and forbids the No Quarter policy of killing prisoners of war — except when taking prisoners endangers the capturing unit. Moreover, concerning the ethics of fighting a civil war, Article 70, Section III stipulates that “the use of poison in any manner, be it to poison wells, or food, or arms, is wholly excluded from modern warfare. He that uses it puts himself out of the pale of the law and usages of war.”

The Code forbids torture as warfare; thus Article 44, Section II prohibits “all wanton violence committed against persons in the invaded country, all destruction of property not commanded by the authorized officer, all robbery, all pillage or sacking, even after taking a place by main force, all rape, wounding, maiming, or killing of such inhabitants, are prohibited under the penalty of death, or such other severe punishment as may seem adequate for the gravity of the offense. A soldier, officer, or private, in the act of committing such violence, and disobeying a superior ordering him to abstain from it, may be lawfully killed on the spot by such superior.”

Black prisoners of war
The Lieber Code military law concorded with the Emancipation Proclamation (1863) and prohibited racist discrimination against black soldiers of the Union Army, specifically the Confederate Army denying them the rights and privileges of prisoners of war. Those stipulations of U.S. military law specifically addressed the Confederate government’s proclamation that the Confederate Army would treat captured black soldiers of the Union Army as escaped slaves, and not as prisoners of war, subject either to summary execution or to re-enslavement in the Confederacy; likewise, the white officers commanding the captured black soldiers would be denied prisoner-of-war status and would be arrested, tried, and condemned as common criminals for helping slaves escape human bondage.

Hard measures

Regarding a successful military occupation, the Lieber Code proposed a reciprocal relationship between the U.S. military authority and the Confederate civilian population, whose co-operation with the military authority would ensure considerations and good treatment for the civilian populace. That against guerrilla warfare and armed resistance to martial law the Union Army would subject the insubordinate, enemy civilians to imprisonment and death.

Moreover, to defend against the Confederate Army’s violations of the laws of war, by way of irregular fighters, the Lieber Code allowed retaliation by musketry against Confederate POWs, and allowed the summary execution of captured enemy civilians (spies, saboteurs, francs-tireurs, guerrillas) caught attacking the Union Army and the United States.

In the 19th century, the Lieber Code’s legalized retaliation against prisoners of war derived from Lieber’s preference for short wars fought and won with decisive warfare, as proposed in the strategy and tactics of the Prussian military science of Carl von Clausewitz. To that end, the Lieber Code legitimized and justified aggressive war to expand the operational range of the Union Army’s prosecution of the civil war to conquer the Confederacy and free the slaves.

Occupation of the Confederacy

For the conquest and military occupation of the Confederate States of America, Gen. William Tecumseh Sherman based his Special Field Orders No. 120 (November 9, 1864) upon General Orders No. 100 (April 24, 1863) for the Union Army. To realize a peaceful military occupation of the state of Georgia, Special Field Order No. 120 stipulated that “in districts and neighborhoods where the army is unmolested no destruction of such property should be permitted; but, should guerrillas or bushwhackers molest our march, or should the inhabitants burn bridges, obstruct roads, or otherwise manifest local hostility, then army commanders should order and enforce a devastation more or less relentless according to the measure of such hostility.”

Moreover, the Lieber Code (1863) was the military law applied to the prosecution of war crimes and for equal prisoner-of-war exchanges between the Union Army and the Confederate Army, regardless of the skin color of the soldier.

Legacy

International law
In the late 19th century and in the early 20th century, the parties to the Hague Conventions of 1899 and 1907 used the Lieber Code (1863) as a basis for their legislation of the international law of war and the codification (definition and description) of what is a war crime and of what is a crime against humanity. In the mid 20th century, in the aftermath of the Second World War (1939–1945), at the war-crime Nuremberg Trials (November 1945 – October 1946) and at the Tokyo Trials (May 1946 – November 1948) the jurists determined that, by the year 1939, most governments in the world knew of the existence the law of war agreed in Switzerland, and thus most governments knew the legal responsibilities of the belligerent parties, of neutral countries, and of the refugees from the war.

Philippine–American War
An abridged version of the Lieber Code was published in The War of the Rebellion: A Compilation of the Official Records of the Union and Confederate Armies (1899). Lieber's son, Guido Norman Lieber, was the Judge Advocate General of the Army f (1895–1901), during the Spanish–American War (April 21 – August 13, 1898) and Philippine–American War (February 4, 1899 – July 2, 1902). The Lieber Code was the military law then applied for courts martial of American military personnel, and for litigation against the Filipino natives and against the Filipino revolutionaries fighting the U.S. occupation of the Philippine Islands; e.g. the unlawful concentration camps of Gen. J. Franklin Bell and war-crime trial of Littleton Waller.

U.S. Law of War Manual
In 2015, the United States Department of Defense published its Law of War Manual. It was updated and revised in May 2016. The Manual explicitly refers to the Lieber Code, and the Lieber Code's influence on the Law of War Manual is apparent throughout.

See also
Command responsibility
International criminal law

References

External links

The full text of the Lieber Code
The full text of the Lieber Code at the Yale Avalon Project
Text of the Law of War Manual alternate link

American Civil War documents
Law of war
Philippine–American War
General orders
United States military law
Legal history of the United States
1863 documents
Codes of conduct
Military emancipation in the American Civil War